Julian Soutter (born 20 August 1994) is a South African first-class cricketer. He was included in the North West squad for the 2016 Africa T20 Cup. In September 2018, he was named in Limpopo's squad for the 2018 Africa T20 Cup.

References

External links
 

1994 births
Living people
South African cricketers
Limpopo cricketers
North West cricketers
People from Klerksdorp